Chymomyza is a genus of vinegar flies (insects in the family Drosophilidae).

Species
C. albitarsis (Hendel, 1917)
C. aldrichii Sturtevant, 1916
C. amoena (Loew, 1862)
C. atrimana Okada, 1956
C. avikam Burla, 1954
C. bambara Burla, 1954
C. bicolor Lamb, 1914
C. bicoloripes (Malloch, 1926)
C. brevis Okada, 1981
C. caudatula Oldenberg, 1914
C. cinctifrons Meijere, 1924
C. clavata Okada, 1981
C. costata (Zetterstedt, 1838)
C. coxata Wheeler, 1952
C. demae Watabe & Liang, 1990
C. diatropa Grimaldi, 1986
C. distincta (Egger, 1862)
C. eungellae Bock, 1982
C. exophthalma Grimaldi, 1986
C. femorata Okada, 1981
C. flabellata Okada, 1981
C. flagellata Okada, 1981
C. formosana Okada, 1976
C. fuscimana (Zetterstedt, 1838)
C. guyanensis Grimaldi, 1986
C. jamaicensis Grimaldi, 1986
C. japonica Okada, 1956
C. laevilimbata Duda, 1927
C. lahu Burla, 1954
C. longicauda Okada, 1981
C. maculipennis Hendel, 1936
C. mafu Burla, 1954
C. mesopecta Wheeler, 1968
C. mexicana Wheeler, 1949
C. microdiopsis Grimaldi, 1986
C. mycopelates Grimaldi, 1986
C. nigrimanus (Meigen, 1830)
C. nigripes Okada, 1981
C. novobscura Watabe & Liang, 1991
C. obscura (Meijere, 1911)
C. obscuroides Okada, 1976
C. oldenbergi Duda, 1934
C. olympia Wheeler, 1960
C. pararufithorax Vaidya & Godbole, 1973
C. pectinifemur Duda, 1927
C. perarufithorax Vaidya & Godbole, 1973
C. poena Bock, 1982
C. primaeva Grimaldi, 1987
C. procnemis (Williston, 1896)
C. procnemoides Wheeler, 1952
C. procnemolita Grimaldi, 1986
C. rufa Okada, 1981
C. rufithorax (Meijere, 1911)
C. scutellata Okada, 1981
C. subobscura Okada, 1981
C. taiwanica Lin & Wheeler, 1977
C. tetonensis Wheeler, 1949
C. vaidyai Okada, 1976
C. wirthi Wheeler, 1954
C. xanthosoma Lin & Wheeler, 1977
C. yvettae Tsacas, 1990

References

Further reading

External links

 

Drosophilidae
Drosophilidae genera
Taxa named by Leander Czerny